The Bowen knot (also known as the heraldic knot in symbolism) is not a true knot, but is rather a heraldic knot, sometimes used as a heraldic charge. It is named after the Welshman James Bowen (died 1629) and is also called true lover's knot. It consists of a rope in the form of a continuous loop laid out as an upright square shape with loops at each of the four corners. Since the rope is not actually knotted, it would in topological terms be considered an unknot.

In Norwegian heraldry a Bowen knot is called a valknute (valknut) and the municipal coat of arms of Lødingen from 1984 has a  femsløyfet valknute which means a Bowen knot with five loops.

An angular Bowen knot is such a knot with no rounded sides, so that it appears to be made of five squares. A Bowen knot with lozenge-shaped loops is called a bendwise Bowen knot or a Bowen cross.

The Dacre, Hungerford, Lacy, Shakespeare, and Tristram knots are all considered variations of the Bowen knot, and are sometimes blazoned as such.

The Bowen knot resembles the symbol ⌘ (looped square), which is used on Apple Keyboards as the symbol of the Command key. However, the origin of this use is not related to the use of the Bowen knot in heraldic designs.

References

Sources 
 
 Heraldic Templates — Knots.

Heraldic knots
Visual motifs